Jorge Lozano and Todd Witsken won in the final 2–6, 6–4, 6–4 against Patrick McEnroe and Tim Wilkison.

Seeds
Champion seeds are indicated in bold text while text in italics indicates the round in which those seeds were eliminated.

 Jorge Lozano /  Todd Witsken (champions)
 Patrick McEnroe /  Tim Wilkison (final)
 Ricardo Acioly /  Dacio Campos (semifinals)
 Danilo Marcelino /  Mauro Menezes (first round)

Draw

External links
 1989 Rio de Janeiro Open Doubles draw

Rio de Janeiro Open
1989 Grand Prix (tennis)